David P. Givens (born December 26, 1966) is an American politician who has served in the Kentucky Senate from the 9th district since 2009. Givens was re-elected by the members of the Kentucky State Senate as the President pro tempore of the Kentucky Senate and has served in the office for the 2019 Legislative Session, 2020 Legislative Session, and 2021 Legislative Session.

Education
1985 Green County High School, valedictorian. WKU, MA 1997. WKU, BS Ag 1989

References

|-

1966 births
21st-century American politicians
Republican Party Kentucky state senators
Living people
People from Green County, Kentucky
Western Kentucky University alumni